Mountain Men is an American reality television series that airs on the History channel. The first season premiered on May 31, 2012; the tenth season premiered on June 3, 2021.

Series overview

The + following the number of episodes indicates the number of specials aired during that season.

Episodes

Season 1 (2012)

Season 2 (2013)

Season 3 (2014)

Season 4 (2015)

Season 5 (2016)

Season 6 (2017)

Season 7 (2018)

Season 8 (2019)

Season 9 (2020–21)

Season 10 (2021)

References

External links

Lists of American reality television series episodes